Maaron Business School is a school in Douala, Cameroon, that provides Africans with the opportunity to obtain British and American international qualifications in the fields of business, accounting and actuarial science. The school was founded in 2004 and received formal Cameroon State Accreditation by ministerial decree on 14 May 2006.

The school provides tuition towards the professional qualifications even though formal UCRS accreditation has not yet been granted formally by the ACCA. This does not make the provision of ACCA qualifications illegal, as the UCRS is not a requirement to offer tuition towards such courses.

In May 2007, the school became a bilingual exam center for the Society of Actuaries examinations starting in fall 2007. As a result, the school has launched the first Actuarial Science course available in Francophone sub-Saharan Africa. The SOA exams review courses are intended to produce the first SOA-qualified actuaries in the region.

Maaron Training is the first professional school of its kind in Central Africa. The school does not issue any qualifications on its own, instead it trains students to pass international qualifications in their chosen field of expertise. Through this Anglo-Saxon system, students achieve internationally recognised credentials.

Since 2006, Maaron Business School has partnered with KASNEB to bring to students in Cameroon the opportunity to sit and pass  examinations in Accounting (CPA), business administration (CPS), Information technology (CICT) Credit Management (CCP) and Financial Analysis (CSIA). At 25 January 2011, the school has trained 1232 students towards these professional qualifications.

Typically, classes are organised in semesters starting around September and February each year.

External links
/ Official website

Universities and colleges in Cameroon
Educational institutions established in 2004
Douala
2004 establishments in Cameroon
Business schools in Africa